Welcome to the Punch is a 2013 British action thriller film written and directed by Eran Creevy and starring James McAvoy, Mark Strong, and Andrea Riseborough. The script had been placed on the 2010 Brit List, a film-industry-compiled list of the best unproduced screenplays in British film. With seven votes, the film was placed third.

Plot 
Four gunmen emerge from a building in gas masks, having committed a robbery, and leave on motorbikes. At the same time DI Max Lewinsky is reporting by phone to his superiors that "Sternwood is doing it tonight". Lewinsky sets off in pursuit of the gang in his car. He fails to catch them and suffers an injury after being shot in the leg by Jacob Sternwood, who could have easily killed him but seems to have an aversion to killing.

Three years later Lewinsky is still suffering from his wound and has to use drugs for the pain. He works with DS Sarah Hawks, with whom he is on good terms. While escorting a prisoner, Dean Warns, an ex-soldier suspected of being involved in an illegal arms trade, they are met by ambitious Commander Thomas Geiger and DCI Nathan Bartnick who inform them that Warns is to be released due to lack of evidence. Warns had been seen by a security guard in a container yard in connection with the offence but now the guard has retracted his statement.

Lewinsky learns that Sternwood's son, Ruan, has collapsed on an aircraft runway while travelling under an alias and has been hospitalized. Ruan had made a call to an Iceland landline number before he collapsed, leading a police taskforce journeying to Iceland to find Jacob Sternwood, but Lewinsky has no faith in this idea. The police ignore Lewinsky's doubts; they go to Iceland and surround Sternwood's property but he escapes, leaving behind a booby trap bomb which kills several policemen. Lewinsky suggests that Ruan's location be made public to draw Jacob out of hiding, and offers to stay in the hospital with Sarah to await Jacob's appearance. Jacob goes to the hospital to confirm his son's situation and manages to leave without being caught. Ruan dies shortly afterwards but it is decided not to reveal this on the off-chance that Sternwood will return to try to free his son. Lewinsky tracks down the security guard who had retracted his statement, thinking that Sternwood may have forced him to do so, but the guard refuses to help. Meanwhile, Sarah follows Warns to the container yard to look for evidence but is intercepted by Warns who kills her.

Bartnick is contacted by Sternwood. Bartnick arranges to meet Sternwood at a club to tell him who shot Ruan. Geiger, having tapped the phone call, informs Lewinsky about the meeting. Lewinsky goes to the club to anticipate Sternwood's arrival but Bartnick and Warns are already there working together and Lewinsky is caught in a trap. A gunfight follows between Lewinsky, Bartnick and Warns, and Sternwood, during which Bartnick is fatally shot by Sternwood. Sternwood decides to protect Lewinsky, apparently as a result of their previous encounter when Sternwood had shot Lewinsky, however after the gunfight Lewinsky attacks Sternwood but is overcome by him then Sternwood demands to be taken to see his son. Lewinsky complies without revealing that Ruan is dead, and takes Sternwood to the hospital mortuary. Sternwood is heartbroken and incensed by the realisation that his son is dead. Whilst at the hospital mortuary Lewinsky discovers that Sarah is dead when he comes across her body on a stretcher.

Sternwood and Lewinsky now confront Warns at his house. Warns is told that his collaboration with Geiger is known, along with the details of the gunrunning trade. A shootout ensues resulting in Warns being taken prisoner and forced to contact Geiger to arrange a meeting at "The Punch", a section of the container yard. Lewinsky and Sternwood force Warns to go with them to the meeting. When Geiger arrives they ambush him. Lewinsky blames Geiger for Sarah's death and accuses him of complicity in the arms deal among other criminal dealings. Geiger admits "turning a blind eye" on many occasions. Suddenly armed military contractors from Kincade make their presence known by opening fire which is followed by another gunfight during which Lewinsky kills Warns and Sternwood shoots Geiger dead. Lewinsky and Sternwood now face each other and Lewinsky raises his gun, but recalling the earlier time when Sternwood deliberately did not kill him, allows him to flee then presents himself to the arriving police.

Cast 
 James McAvoy as DI Max Lewinsky
 Mark Strong as Jacob Sternwood
 Andrea Riseborough as DS Sarah Hawks
 Elyes Gabel as Ruan Sternwood 
 Peter Mullan as Roy Edwards
 David Morrissey as Lieutenant Commander Thomas Geiger
 Daniel Kaluuya as Juka Ogadowa
 Daniel Mays as DCI Nathan Bartnick
 Johnny Harris as Dean Warns 
 Dannielle Brent as Karen Edwards
 Jason Flemyng as Harvey Crown
 Ruth Sheen as Nan

Production 
The film was produced by Ben Pugh and Rory Aitken of Between the Eyes, who also produced Eran Creevy's debut feature Shifty. Brian Kavanaugh-Jones also served as a producer on the movie with Worldview Entertainment. Ridley Scott and Liza Marshall of Scott Free executive produced the film. Shooting took place mostly in London, starting 28 July. Some of the interior and exterior scenes were filmed at London College of Communication in Elephant and Castle in August 2011. City of Westminster College's Paddington Green Campus was used for the press conference scene.

Release 
Welcome To The Punch premiered at the Glasgow Film Festival. It debuted in third place in the United Kingdom on 15 March 2013, where it grossed £460,000 across 370 cinemas in its opening weekend. In 2012, IFC Films bought distribution rights for the United States and it opened on 27 March 2013, where it grossed $9,747. It was released on home video in the U.K. in July 2013.

Reception 
On review aggregator Rotten Tomatoes, the film holds a 48% approval rating based on 56 reviews, with an average rating of 5.6/10. The website's critics consensus reads: "Welcome to the Punch is a little deeper and more thoughtful than most police dramas -- but not quite enough to surmount its thinly written characters and numbing violence." On Metacritic, the film has a weighted average score of 49 out of 100, based on 16 critics, indicating "mixed or average reviews".

Peter Bradshaw of The Guardian called it an ambitious but predictable film that "runs out of steam" by the end. Emma Dibdin of Total Film wrote, "There's an emotional vacuum at its centre but Welcome To The Punch is an adrenalin shot to the heart of the Brit-crime genre." Dan Jolin of Empire called it "a confident, ambitious and action-rich Brit thriller, albeit one whose characters and clarity suffer from the frantic intensity of its pacing." Guy Lodge of Variety described it as "a proficient but personality-free policer that demands little of either its audience or its enviable best-of-British cast". Frank Scheck of The Hollywood Reporter wrote that "despite its fast pacing and well-staged action set-pieces, the film fails to make much of an impression." Robert Abele of the Los Angeles Times called it "derivative, dumb fun". Manohla Dargis of The New York Times wrote that it is an "enjoyable absurdity" that is unintentionally funny yet still recommended.

References

External links 
 
 
 
 

2013 films
2010s British films
2010s English-language films
British crime films
British action films
British thriller films
British gangster films
Films directed by Eran Creevy
Films set in London
Scott Free Productions films
Worldview Entertainment films